The Kawasaki H1 Mach III was a  two-stroke 500 cc sport bike made by Kawasaki from 1969 through to 1975.

History
By mid-1960s, the US had become the largest motorcycle market. American riders were demanding bikes with more horsepower and higher maximum speeds. Kawasaki already had the largest-displacement Japanese machine with their 650 cc four-stroke W series, but it did not fit the niche Kawasaki was aiming for. Honda had introduced its Honda CB450 in 1965 and in 1969, the Suzuki T500 Titan/Cobra appeared. Also in development was the Yamaha XS 650. Already familiar with the Honda CB450, Kawasaki development began work on the top secret N100 Plan in 1967.

The goal was to produce a motorcycle with 500 cc displacement that was able to develop 60 hp and have 13-second quarter-mile times, then considered over the achievable limit for a road bike. When announced, the H1 was critiqued in UK motorcycling press for their "own ambitious claim" of "the fastest and best accelerating road machine ever produced, being capable of 124 mph and 12.4 sec. for the standing start quarter mile". Cycle World's 1969 test quoted 119.14 mph and 13.20 seconds, with bike-retailer Reads of London at 109 and 13.5, whereas Dutch motorcycle drag racer Henk Vink, importer of Kawasakis into the Netherlands, was quoted as achieving 13.48.

The Mach III appeared in the US in 1969 with a white sculpted fuel tank and blue racing stripe along the lower part of the tank, and special Dunlop K77 tires.

It had Mikuni VM 28 mm carburetors, and thyristor-based capacitor discharge ignition (CDI) developing 25,000–30,000 volts.

Though not a direct successor of the Kawasaki W2, the W2 was the only four-stroke motorcycle Kawasaki had for the American market and that market was not like that of Japan where the W2 sold well. In the US, the Mach III proved to be very popular. Motorcyclist said the Mach's power-to-weight ratio  was the best "ever produced in a motorcycle meant to sell to anyone who has the money to purchase it."

Handling characteristics were not favorable according to many sources. "Viewed logically, the Kawasaki H1 had many flaws. The gearbox was odd, with neutral below first, the brakes very questionable and the handling decidedly marginal in every situation - except when the bike was stopped with the engine switched off. Not for nothing was the H1 known as, 'The triple with the ripple'."

The three-cylinder 500 was for all purposes succeeded in 1979 by the Kawasaki Z500/Z550 four-stroke four cylinder.

Specifications
Induction: 3x Mikuni VM28SC carbs.
Ignition: Kick start.
Frame: Double cradle tube frame with twin top tubes reinforced at three intermediate points. 
Front and Rear Brakes: 200mm drum front, 180mm drum rear. Later to a Single 296mm disc for the front

Changes by year
1971 — H1A new fuel tank without knee recesses
1972 — H1B CDI replaced with a battery ignition, front disc brake, steering oil damper adopted
1973 — H1D 2nd generation race tail that  partially covered taillight similar to the H2, CDI unit from the H2, dropped steering damper and rear brake air scoop and rear brake rod replaced rear brake cable. 
1974 — H1E new CDI unit and crank case check valve
1975 — H1F
1976 — KH500 slightly less horsepower (52),, different gear shift pattern (previously all H series were 5 up, changed to 1 down 4 up), water resistant brake pads

Racing
H1R derivatives of the Mach III were raced by Ginger Molloy in Grands Prix, his "Green Meanie" finishing 2nd just behind Giacomo Agostini's MV Agusta in the 1970 500 cc World Championship, and by UK riders Paul Smart and Cliff Carr in Europe and North America.

References

Standard motorcycles
H1 Mach III 500
Motorcycles introduced in 1969
Sport bikes
Two-stroke motorcycles